Eion was a city of ancient Macedonia.

Eion may also refer to:
Eion (given name)
Eion (Argolis), a town of ancient Argolis
Eion (Pieria), a town of ancient Pieria
Eion (Thrace), a town of ancient Thrace